Cum Town was a comedy podcast that was hosted by New York City-based comedians Nick Mullen, Stavros Halkias, and Adam Friedland, and produced between 2016 and 2022. During its run, it was consistently one of the most popular podcasts on Patreon and concluded as one of the top 25 comedy podcasts on Spotify and Apple Podcasts. In July 2022, it was succeeded by Mullen and Friedland's spin-off podcast and interview show The Adam Friedland Show.

History 
In 2016, Cum Town was created by Mullen, the primary host and producer of the show. Halkias was the first co-host; Friedland became a second co-host, starting as a frequent guest and first appearing in the show's second episode.

The podcast concluded in June 2022 after months of the hosts suggesting its end as well as their renewed interest in stand-up comedy, particularly Halkias, who released his debut comedy special that month. On June 25, 2022, Halkias announced that he was no longer part of Cum Town. Subsequently, Mullen and Friedland revealed their plan for a spin-off podcast—The Adam Friedland Show—to be hosted by Friedland and produced by Mullen.

Content
Cum Town episodes were typically 60 minutes long and improvised. Featured guests include Tim Dillon, David Cross, Bam Margera, Dan Soder, Bonnie McFarlane, Jim Norton, Kurt Metzger, Brandon Wardell, and Dasha Nekrasova. 

Many of the show's riffs come from crude puns and rhymes—for example, "Louis SeemsGay" for Louis C.K.—and involved sexually explicit scenarios or ethnic and racial stereotypes. Conversations generally centered on the hosts' personal lives, the news, the worlds of stand-up comedy and social media, and pop culture history. Friedland often served as the butt of Mullen's and Halkias's jokes and insults.

Mullen does many celebrity impressions, including Donald Trump, Barack Obama, Tucker Carlson, Michael Douglas, Dennis Hopper, E. Jean Carroll, Dwayne Johnson, Joe Biden, Andrew Cuomo, Patrick Warburton, Rip Torn, Gene Hackman, Jon Hamm, Norm MacDonald, Joe List, Mark Normand, Jason Statham, Ice-T, Dave Portnoy, and Homer Simpson, with some episodes of the show featuring him trying to perfect a new impression on-air.

Availability and listenership 
Weekly free episodes of the show were available via Spotify, Apple Podcasts, and Audible, among other services. Subscribers who contributed at least $5 per month via Patreon gain access to additional weekly premium bonus episodes. During the early months of the COVID-19 pandemic, the show was conducted via Zoom; episodes were broadcast live via YouTube.

As of June 2022, Cum Town was the 10th-most popular podcast on Patreon and the 12th-most popular creator on the platform overall; with more than 20,000 paying members, it had around $100,000 in monthly earnings. It was the number one podcast on the platform for most of 2017 and 2018. On Apple Podcasts, it was the 17th-most popular comedy podcast in the U.S. and 126th overall.

Hosts

Nick Mullen 

Nick Mullen (born December 13, 1988) is a stand-up comedian, comedy writer, and podcaster. Much of his comedy is ironic, observational and self-deprecating, and focuses on internet culture.

A nationally touring stand-up, Mullen earned recognition in the early 2010s; he was a two-time finalist for the Funniest Person in Austin contest (2010 and 2011), was selected as part of Montreal's Just for Laughs festival New Faces program in 2012, and was a finalist for New York's Funniest Stand-Up at the 2015 New York Comedy Festival. After a break, he resumed performing in 2022. 

Mullen's writing credits include Comedy Knockout on TruTV (premiered 2016), Make Me Understand with Jim Norton (2016 IFC television pilot), 2017's Problematic with Moshe Kasher (Comedy Central), and Sacha Baron Cohen's Who Is America.

Stavros Halkias 

Stavros Halkias (born February 11, 1989) is a stand-up comedian and podcaster. Active since the early 2010s, he is based in New York City and tours nationally. He released his debut comedy special Live At The Lodge Room in June 2022.

Halkias was born and raised in Baltimore, Maryland, to Greek immigrant parents. He began performing comedy while attending the University of Maryland, Baltimore County. In 2012, he was named Baltimore's New Comedian of the Year. He has written and performed on Adult Swim, IFC, MSG Network's People Talking Sports and Other Stuff, and Comedy Central series including Comedy Central Stand Up Featuring. Since 2019, he has co-hosted the basketball podcast Pod Don't Lie with Sam Morril.

Adam Friedland 

Adam Friedland (born April 10, 1987) is a stand-up comedian, sketch comedian, and podcaster. 

Born to South African Lithuanian-Jewish immigrant parents, he primarily grew up in Las Vegas. Friedland got his start in the Washington, D.C. comedy scene by running and hosting comedy shows at the DIY venue Subterranean A; he gained local notability in the local comedy scene for his "alternative" performance piece-oriented comedy. He performed at the Bentzen Ball in 2013 and 2014 and was named to the annual "Best of D.C." list by the Washington City Paper. He moved to New York City in 2014. Outside of Cum Town, he is best known as the host of the live alternative comedy show Funny Moms; the show began in Washington in 2012 with co-host Sara Starmour and moved to Brooklyn in 2015.

Reception

Dirtbag left association
Cum Town was often associated with the dirtbag left, though it is not expressly political. A February 2020 New York Times article described Cum Town (by allusion, citing its "unprintable name") as "bards of the new American left", alongside podcasts Chapo Trap House and Red Scare. Several Chapo hosts, including Amber A'Lee Frost, Will Menaker, and Felix Biederman have appeared on Cum Town; Mullen, Halkias, and Friedland have made multiple appearances on Chapo.

Though the hosts occasionally discuss their responses to current events and politics—with all three expressing support for 2020 presidential candidate Bernie Sanders—they deny any specific political agenda. In May 2017, Friedland tweeted, "Cum town is not a socialist podcast it's not a fascist podcast it's a podcast about being gay with your dad."

In July 2021, the hosts disagreed with Andrew Marantz's characterization of the podcast as a "flagship product of the dirtbag left" in a New Yorker article. Halkias instead suggested that its motivating force was not political but financial. The hosts initially believed the podcast would be unsuccessful, "and people are stupid enough to give us money, and we are trapped doing [the podcast]".

Criticism 
In association with their dirtbag left peers, the podcast and its hosts have been criticized for their use of ironic offensiveness. Critical bloggers have argued that the hosts' use of slurs and edgy jokes, particularly Mullen's, perpetuates harassment and continually crosses the line into actual hatred and contempt. Others have countered that offensiveness is subjective.

Some online commentators have made a distinction between the podcast and their listeners, critiquing the show's fan base as opposed to the hosts, or critiquing both in tandem. In 2020, the podcast's subreddit (which was not moderated or endorsed by the hosts) was removed from Reddit due to the platform's new policies on hate speech.

References

External links 

2016 establishments in New York City
2016 podcast debuts
2022 disestablishments in New York City
2022 podcast endings
American podcasts
Audio podcasts
Comedy and humor podcasts
Patreon creators